Project Roomkey is a federally (FEMA) funded homeless relief initiative in the state of California. The program was launched in April of 2020.

The project was expected to end in late 2020. It has been continued and was expanded in March 2021 with the Los Angeles City Council approving a measure that would allow the city to compel hotel owners to participate in the program even if they did not want to.

National publications such as Newsweek have noted that the program is reserved for homeless individuals aged 65 or older or who have an underlying medical condition.   As of March 22, 2021, LA County had counted 48,038 unsheltered people, 15,000 rooms promised, 2,261 rooms under contract, 2,261 rooms operational and 1,724 rooms occupied. By these numbers, 28% of the operational rooms being paid for remain unoccupied, the county has made 15% of the goal of 15,000 rooms operational, and the program has successfully addressed temporary housing for 3.6% of the county's homeless population. As of March 4, 2021, $59 million had been spent on the project.   

On March 1, 1672, rooms were occupied. The cost of the program averages out by these numbers to $35,308 per room over 10 months or roughly $117 per room, per day.  The actual per day cost would come to more than this average due to actual occupancy being lower than the cumulative totals.   

By October 2020, the program that was launched in April of 2020 had only found permanent housing for 5% of those in the temporary housing.

The program is intended to operate only during the pandemic. The state intends to transition residents out of the program at the end of the pandemic.

References

Government of California
Welfare in California
Federal Emergency Management Agency